United Airlines Flight 2885 was a scheduled cargo flight from Cleveland to Los Angeles, with stopover in Detroit. On January 11, 1983, a DC-8 operating Flight 2885 crashed after take-off from Detroit, killing all 3 crew members. The National Transportation Safety Board (NTSB) investigation determined that the cause for the crash was pilot error.  A radioactive package was found on board, but no radioactive material was spilled.

Chronology 
The aircraft involved in the accident, a 14-year-old Douglas DC-8F-54, registration  departed Detroit Metropolitan Airport at 22:15 CST on January 10, 1983, operating United Airlines Flight 2894 bound for Cleveland, Ohio. At Cleveland, the flight became United 2885; the DC-8 departed Cleveland at 01:15 on January 11. It arrived at Detroit airport at 01:52; after a cargo turnaround and refueling, the aircraft began its takeoff roll at 02:51. After taking off, the witnesses described that the nose of the aircraft pitched up to an unusually high position, causing temporary engine surges (witnesses on the ground reported occasional fire eruptions from the engines); soon after, the DC-8 began a gradual right roll, eventually entering an upset condition.

The three crew members were Captain William S. Todd (55); First Officer James G. Day (51); and Flight Engineer Robert E. Lee (50). All three were killed.

Causes 
The National Transportation Safety Board (NTSB) investigation revealed that, during the cargo turnaround at Detroit, the pilots had a conversation in the cockpit; at one point, the captain asked the first officer if he was trading seats with the flight engineer, to which the flight engineer said “Oh, we’re switching now” the captain didn’t object flight engineer and allowed him to perform the takeoff, contrary to both United Airlines and Federal Aviation Administration rules.

As the investigators found, the flight engineer had entered a DC-8 first officer upgrade training in June 1979; however, the instructors found his abilities less than adequate and the training was terminated two months later. The flight engineer resumed his first officer training in February 1980, this time for the Boeing 737; while improving, his abilities were still inadequate—as his instructor stated, "his attitude could not be better and he is a very hard worker, however, he has not made normal progress in his first full year as a first officer." After several failed en-route and proficiency checks, the flight engineer made an agreement not to bid anymore for pilot vacancies and remain a flight engineer for the balance of his career.

The direct reason for an abnormally nose-up position was found to be an excessively high stabilizer trim setting (7.5 units airplane nose-up); likely, in the confusion due to switching seats, the pilots failed to reset the trim setting while performing takeoff checklists. (It was reported the first officer made this mistake occasionally.) Taking off at night, with no visual references, the inexperienced flight engineer did not manage to correct the attitude in time, leading to engine surges, aircraft banking and eventually an upset and an unrecoverable stall. It is not known why the captain did not manage to correct the situation. One possibility is that the flight engineer froze on the controls as he put the DC-8 into a gradual bank, and the opposite inputs from the captain had no effect on the movement of the stabilizer. The captain's decision to allow the flight engineer to perform the takeoff was considered a contributing factor in the accident.

During an investigation, other United pilots anonymously admitted that swapping seats and flight engineers performing takeoffs and/or landings, while a rare occurrence, were not unheard of on ferry or cargo flights.

See also
 Northwest Airlines Flight 188, where the pilots overflew their destination by over a hundred miles due to a lack of attention 
 Pinnacle Airlines Flight 3701, a crash where the pilots decided to take the aircraft to its maximum altitude and subsequently crashed 
 Aeroflot Flight 593, a crash in which the pilots let a minor fly the aircraft
 Aeroflot Flight 6502, a crash in which the pilots bet they could land blind

References

External links 
Aviation Safety Network: N8053 at Detroit Airport, 11 January 1983

Aviation accidents and incidents in the United States in 1983
Accidents and incidents involving cargo aircraft
1983 in Michigan
Airliner accidents and incidents in Michigan
Airliner accidents and incidents caused by pilot error
2885
Accidents and incidents involving the Douglas DC-8
January 1983 events in the United States
Detroit Metropolitan Airport